The Titanium Explorer is an Australian autogyro designed by Neil Sheather and Andrew Pepper and produced by Titanium Auto Gyro (TAG Aviation Pty Limited) of Attunga, New South Wales. The aircraft is supplied complete and ready-to-fly, although development of a kit for amateur construction was underway in 2015.

Design and development
Development of the design was started in 2009 as a result of noted deficiencies in imported autogyro designs for Australian conditions.

The Explorer features a single main rotor, a two-seats-in tandem open cockpit, each with a windshield, tricycle landing gear with wheel pants, plus a tail caster and a four-cylinder, liquid and air-cooled, four stroke  Rotax 912 or  turbocharged Rotax 914 engine in pusher configuration.

The aircraft fuselage box-section frame is made from titanium, while the cockpit fairing is made from carbon fiber reinforced polymer and fibreglass composites. The design is noted for its rugged suspension, designed for Australian outback conditions.

Specifications (Explorer)

See also
List of rotorcraft

References

External links

Explorer
2010s Australian sport aircraft
Single-engined pusher autogyros